Kim Ly Maher (born September 5, 1971 in Ho Chi Minh City, Vietnam) is an Vietnamese-American, former collegiate All-American, Olympic champion, right-handed softball player and current Head Coach originally from Fresno, California. She competed in college for the Fresno State Bulldogs in both the Big West and Western Athletic Conference from 1991-94, ranking in the latter for career batting average (.401) for her last two years and leading them in two semifinal finishes at the 1991 and 1992 Women's College World Series, being named All-Tournament for both events. Maher won gold at the 1996 Atlanta Olympics with Team USA. Maher is head of the SWOSU Bulldogs softball team.

Career

She competed at the 1996 Summer Olympics in Atlanta where she received a gold medal with the American team.

Maher played NCAA Division I softball for the Fresno State Bulldogs.  She is the former head coach of the Purdue University softball team.   Maher resigned after her Boilers posted a 23-32 record during the 2013 season and failed to qualify for postseason play for the fourth consecutive season.

Statistics

Fresno State Bulldogs

College

References

External links

1971 births
Living people
Softball players from California
Fresno State Bulldogs softball players
Olympic softball players of the United States
Softball players at the 1996 Summer Olympics
Olympic gold medalists for the United States in softball
American softball coaches
Softball coaches from California
Purdue Boilermakers softball coaches
Medalists at the 1996 Summer Olympics
Sportspeople from Ventura County, California
Vietnamese emigrants to the United States
Sportspeople from Ho Chi Minh City